Reputation parasitism, reputation leeching or credibility leeching is a legal term regarding marketing. It refers to when one advertiser uses another brand's good reputation to market his own product. In many places it is illegal to do so. For instance in Sweden it is outlawed according to Marknadsföringslagen ("Swedish Marketing Act") (1995:450). Examples include having a product in a design that is very similar to an existing product or using a similar name.

References 

Trademark law